Bodislavci is a settlement in the Slovene Hills in the Municipality of Ljutomer, Slovenia. The area traditionally belonged to the Styria region and is now included in the Mura Statistical Region.

Name
Bodislavci was attested in written sources in 1445 as Wodischlawczen and  1500 as Ladislafftzen. The name is probably derived from the Slavic personal name *Bǫdislavъ, referring to an early resident of the village.

References

External links
Bodislavci on Geopedia

Populated places in the Municipality of Ljutomer